The 2013 Men's South American Volleyball Club Championship was the fifth official edition of the men's volleyball tournament, played by seven teams over 8–12 May 2013 in Vivo Arena in Belo Horizonte, Brazil. The winning team qualified for the 2013 FIVB Volleyball Men's Club World Championship.

Pools composition

Preliminary round

Pool A

|}

|}

Pool B

|}

|}

Final round

Semifinals

|}

5th place match

|}

3rd place match

|}

Final

|}

Final standing

References

Volleyball
Men's South American Volleyball Club Championship
Volleyball
Men's South American Volleyball Club Championship